Richard Raiswell (born January 1966) is an historian at University of Prince Edward Island, Canada, and Honorary Research Fellow in the School of Graduate Studies, University of New Brunswick, Fredericton. He teaches classes on medieval and Renaissance History, as well as the History of Ideas, specialising, in particular, on premodern geography and exploration, and the antecedents of the Scientific Revolution.

Raiswell was born in Middlesbrough, in the UK, immigrating to Canada in 1979. His education includes a B.A. in History from Carleton University (1992), with an M.A. in Medieval Studies (1995), and a Ph.D. in History both from the University of Toronto (2003).

His recent works include peer-reviewed articles on medieval geographical cognition, the sixteenth-century German Hebraist, Joannes Boemus, and several works on aspects of premodern European demon possession. He is the co-editor of two collections of academic essays.  Shell Games: Studies in Frauds, Scams and Deceit in Early Modern Culture, 1300-1650 with Mark Crane and Margaret Reeves (Centre for Reformation and Renaissance Studies, 2004) and The Devil in Society in Premodern Europe (Centre for Reformation and Renaissance Studies, 2012) with Peter Dendle (Penn State Mont Alto).

He is one of the founders of the journal Preternature: Critical and Historical Studies of the Preternatural (with Kirsten Uszkalo) and now serves as its book review editor. He has been the editor of the Ficino listserv, dedicated to the discussion of Renaissance European history, literature and culture since 1999, and was an adviser on the Witches in Early Modern England Project (2009–2011).

Raiswell is a frequent contributor to CBC Radio, with a regular column on provincial politics on CBC Prince Edward Island's Mainstreet, and occasional spots on Island Morning where he discusses aspects of premodern magic, demonology and the occult. He has also appeared in the Smithsonian Network's Treasures Decoded, now in production, in which he argued against the authenticity of the Vinland Map.

He is a cricket enthusiast, and has published a popular article on the history of cricket on Prince Edward Island in the nineteenth century.

Selected publications
Richard Raiswell with Peter Dendle 
Richard Raiswell with Mark Crane and Margaret Reeves
 Contributor to "The Historical Encyclopedia of World Slavery", 1997,

References

20th-century Canadian historians
Canadian male non-fiction writers
Living people
1966 births
Academic staff of the University of Prince Edward Island
21st-century Canadian historians